The Hôtel des Mille Collines (English: Hotel of the Thousand Hills) is a large hotel in Kigali, Rwanda. It became famous after 1,268 people took refuge inside the building during the Rwandan genocide of 1994. The story of the hotel and its manager at that time, Paul Rusesabagina, was later used as the basis of Terry George's film Hotel Rwanda in 2004.

History
The Belgian airline Sabena built the Hôtel des Mille Collines in 1973 and owned it during the Rwandan Genocide.

The four-star hotel has 112 rooms, a bar, a café, three conference rooms, a restaurant, a swimming pool, and tennis courts.

On August 10, 2005, Sabena Hotels sold the Hotel des Mille Collines to MIKCOR Hotel Holding for US$3.2million (about RWF 1.8 billion). Miko Rwayitare, the managing director of the MIKCOR group, said during the handover held at the hotel on Thursday 16, that the group now owns 89% of the hotel with 8.5% and 2.5% owned by Rwanda Development Bank (BRD) and the government of Rwanda, respectively. Rwayitare is also the executive chairman of Telecel International, a communications company. In April 2014,  Mickor Investment Holdings Ltd turned management of the hotel over to Kempinski Hotels and it was renamed the Hôtel des Mille Collines by Kempinski. The hotel left the Kempinski chain two years later, on April 1, 2016, and returned to its original name.

In popular culture
The hotel is the setting for the film Hotel Rwanda, but it does not actually appear in the movie, which was largely shot in South Africa. The hotel does however appear in the 2005 HBO film Sometimes in April and the 2007 Canadian film Shake Hands with the Devil, which were shot on location in Rwanda.

References

External links

 Hôtel des Mille Collines official website

Buildings and structures in Kigali
Rwandan genocide
Hotels in Rwanda
Hotels established in 1973
Hotel buildings completed in 1973
1973 establishments in Africa